Hajji Morad (also Romanized as Ḩājjī Morād) is a village in Kuhdasht-e Jonubi Rural District, in the Central District of Kuhdasht County, Lorestan Province, Iran. At the 2006 census, its population was 44, in 10 families.

References 

Towns and villages in Kuhdasht County